
Gmina Sobienie-Jeziory is a rural gmina (administrative district) in Otwock County, Masovian Voivodeship, in east-central Poland. Its seat is the village of Sobienie-Jeziory, which lies approximately 19 kilometres (12 mi) south of Otwock and 39 km (24 mi) south-east of Warsaw.

Neighbouring gminas
Gmina Sobienie-Jeziory is bordered by the gminas of Celestynów, Garwolin, Góra Kalwaria, Karczew, Osieck, Warka and Wilga.

Villages
The gmina contains the villages of Dziecinów, Gusin, Karczunek, Nowy Zambrzyków, Piwonin, Przydawki, Radwanków Królewski, Radwanków Szlachecki, Sewerynów, Siedzów, Sobienie Biskupie, Sobienie-Jeziory, Sobienie Kiełczewskie Drugie, Sobienie Kiełczewskie Pierwsze, Sobienie Szlacheckie, Stary Zambrzyków, Szymanowice Duże, Szymanowice Małe, Śniadków Dolny, Śniadków Górny, Śniadków Górny A, Warszawice, Warszówka, Wysoczyn and Zuzanów.

It also contains the hamlets and village districts of Baranówka, Borki, Brzezinka, Brzozowica, Celbuda, Folwark, Kąty, Kępa Radwankowska, Kępa Wysocka, Kolonia Dziecinów, Kolonia Siedzów, Kolonia Sobienie Biskupie, Korea, Kozorzywie, Kurantówka, Leśniki, Łużyce, Nadjezierze, Podborek (Piwonin), Podborek (Śniadków Górny A), Potok, Przedwabie, Sobienie Murowane, Sokołówka, Strugi, Suska, Wielga, Wielkie Góry Warszewickie, Wieś Kochanka, Zajezierze, Zapole and Zastarze.

References
Polish official population figures 2006

Sobienie-Jeziory
Gmina Sobienie Jeziory